Park Drive may refer to:

 Park Drive (Central Park), a circular system of roadways and bike/jogging paths in New York City's Central Park
 Park Drive (cricket), a cricket ground in England
 Park Drive (Parkville), a roadway in Parkville, Victoria
 Park Drive (parkway), a roadway in Boston, Massachusetts